The Hard sleeper (abbreviated YW), is a passenger railway compartment class in the People's Republic of China. Hard sleeper is a class on most Z-series, T-series express trains and K-series rapid trains. They are the cheapest type of sleepers on Chinese trains.

The differences between hard and soft sleeper compartments are as follows:
 6 bunks instead of 4 (3 on each side)
 No door (some type have)
 No blind on the window (but there are curtains)
 Less comfortable bedding, e.g. only one pillow
 No TV screen

The bunks have a length of 180 cm (71 inches) and a width of 60 cm (24 inches). The head space for passengers on the upper and middle bunk is limited, with the middle bunk having 70 cm (28 inches) and the upper bunk having 65 cm (26 inches) of head space.

In addition, the carriage has only a Chinese style toilet at each end whereas the soft sleepers may have a Western style toilet at one end.

Despite its name, the bunks are padded, only less than soft sleepers. Like soft sleepers they have a table, hot water and a rubbish bin. The lower bunk (下) is the roomiest followed by the middle bunk (中). The upper bunk (上) not only has the least room, but one has to be relatively agile to climb up to it. The upper bunk is slightly cheaper than the lower and middle bunk due to its limited space.

Newer trains have power sockets for laptops and mobiles.

Shortly after the trip starts, the carriage official will come around and exchange tickets for berth tokens. Tickets will be returned before arrival at the destination.

References 

Passenger rail transport in China